Earl Sterndale is a village in the Upper Dove Valley in the Peak District, Derbyshire, England, situated near the River Dove, 5 miles south of Buxton, and 8 miles west of Bakewell. The population at the 2011 Census is listed under Hartington Middle Quarter. The farms surrounding the village were medieval monastic granges in the care of the monks of Basingwerk Abbey. The village church, dedicated to St Michael, was built in 1828 on the site of an ancient chapel. It was substantially destroyed in 1941, when it was bombed by the Germans. It was restored in 1952, and still contains a Saxon font.

Earl Sterndale is popular with walkers, as it lies close to the distinctive peaks of Chrome Hill and Parkhouse Hill, and is within walking distance of Hartington and the gateway to Dovedale.

See also
List of places in Derbyshire
Listed buildings in Hartington Middle Quarter

External links

Villages in Derbyshire
Towns and villages of the Peak District
Derbyshire Dales